Gangland or Gang Land may refer to:

 Organized crime, relating to, or carried out by organized criminals
 Gangland (video game), a 2004 computer game from Mediamobsters
 Gangland (TV series), a documentary show on the History Channel that ran from 2007 to 2010
 Gangland (film), a 1998 Filipino movie directed by Peque Gallaga and Lore Reyes
 Gangland, 1998 4-issue comics anthology from Vertigo at DC Comics
 Gangland (album), a 2001 album by Kool & the Gang
 Gangland, a series of mixtapes by Chevy Woods
 "Gangland", a song by Iron Maiden on the album The Number of the Beast
 "Gangland", a song by Future on the mixtape Monster